Kent Babb (born 24 October 1934) is a Trinidadian cricketer. He played in eight first-class matches for Trinidad and Tobago from 1954 to 1962.

See also
 List of Trinidadian representative cricketers

References

External links
 

1934 births
Living people
Trinidad and Tobago cricketers